Bacha Shah Nagar is a village of Rangunia Upazila at Chittagong District in the Division of Chittagong, Bangladesh.

References

Villages in Chittagong Division
Villages in Chittagong District